This article lists songs and whole discographies which have been banned by the BBC (British Broadcasting Corporation) over the years. During its history the corporation has banned songs from a number of high-profile artists, including Cliff Richard, Frank Sinatra, Noël Coward, the Beatles, Ken Dodd, Elvis Presley, Bing Crosby, the BBC Dance Orchestra, Tom Lehrer, Glenn Miller, and George Formby. Some songs were banned for only a limited period, and have since received BBC airplay, while others were banned many years after having been first aired, as was the case of the Cure's "Killing an Arab", ABBA's "Waterloo", Queen's "Killer Queen", the Boomtown Rats' "I Don't Like Mondays" and 67 other songs which were banned from BBC airplay as the first Gulf War began. Judge Dread had all of his 11 singles that entered the UK Singles Chart banned by the BBC, which is the most for any one artist. In recent years, The Kunts have had 3 top 10 singles in the Christmas charts that the BBC refused to play, or even mention in their chart rundowns.

History
On occasion the BBC has seen fit to prevent certain pieces of music from being broadcast if it was felt that these recordings were unsuitable for the British public. Files in the BBC's Written Archives Centre in Caversham, Berkshire that are now available for public inspection show that the Dance Music Policy Committee, set up in the 1930s, took its role as Britain's cultural guardian seriously: one 1942 directive read:

The BBC's director of music, Sir Arthur Bliss, wrote instructions during World War II advising the committee to ban songs "which are slushy in sentiment" or "pop" versions of classical pieces, such as "I'm Always Chasing Rainbows" from the 1918 Broadway show Oh, Look!, which made use of Frédéric Chopin's Fantaisie-Impromptu. Other songs based on Classical music themes that were later banned by the committee due to "distortion of melody, harmony and rhythm" were the Cougars' 1963 single "Saturday Nite at the Duck-Pond", which used music from Swan Lake, and "Baubles, Bangles and Beads", from the 1953 musical Kismet, which was based on the second movement of Alexander Borodin's String Quartet in D.

Other justifications for such bans have included the use of foul language in lyrics, explicit sexual content, alleged drug references, and controversial political subject matter. Don Cornell's 1954 song "Hold My Hand" was banned from airplay due to religious references. Bob Dylan's song "Baby, Let Me Follow You Down" was banned in 1962, as it included the phrase, "God-almighty world". The work of British folk singer Ewan MacColl was banned by the BBC owing to his sympathies with communism. Satire was another possible reason for banning: in 1953, ten of the twelve tracks on humorist Tom Lehrer's album Songs by Tom Lehrer were banned. In February 1956, the British music magazine NME reported that the theme for the film The Man with the Golden Arm, recorded by Eddie Calvert, was also banned. Despite the song being an instrumental, a BBC spokesman reported: "The ban is due to its connection with a film about drugs." Billy May's version, retitled "Main Theme", was approved for transmission.

In certain cases, appeals to the BBC in favour of banning a song have failed or have only been partial. In 1972, Christian morality campaigner Mary Whitehouse failed in her campaign to stop the BBC playing Chuck Berry's "My Ding-a-Ling", and featuring Alice Cooper's "School's Out" on Top of the Pops. In the case of Orchestral Manoeuvres in the Dark's 1980 anti-war song "Enola Gay", a ban was applied only to its airing on the BBC's children's programming, as some within the organisation perceived the word "gay" as a corrupting sexual influence. Occasionally, a ban has first been imposed by an individual DJ refusing to play a particular song; in January 1984, Radio 1's Mike Read refused to play Frankie Goes to Hollywood's "Relax" on his mid-morning show, declaring it "overtly obscene", a decision which the BBC then followed.

In 1997, "Smack My Bitch Up" by the Prodigy was banned due to controversy regarding its lyrics, "change my pitch up, smack my bitch up", which prompted criticism from feminist groups. At the time, the BBC was attempting to shed its old-fashioned image and embrace dance culture, but at the same time they were concerned about broadcasting a song that was believed by some to be about physically assaulting women. In the end, the corporation decided to restrict the song's airplay to a minimum and generally used an instrumental remix version whenever they did play it.

Since the early 2000s, the BBC has claimed that it no longer bans any records. However, cases of direct or indirect censorship have occurred; according to a BBC spokesperson, no official ban was imposed in the case of Linda McCartney's posthumous "The Light Comes from Within", despite her widower Paul McCartney running advertisements in the national press criticising a supposed ban. While the bans on some songs have been lifted, other songs have never been officially cleared for airing on BBC radio, and their status is uncertain – in some cases, records which had been banned have since been played on BBC radio without any official announcement that the ban has ended, such as the Beatles' "A Day in the Life". BBC Radio 1 banned the full version of the Pogues' "Fairytale of New York" in 2007, replacing it with an edited version; however, the ban was quickly lifted due to public outcry.

Censored versus banned
In some cases, it was considered sufficient to censor certain words, rather than banning a song outright. In the case of the Kinks' song "Lola", the BBC's strict ban on advertising led to singer and songwriter Ray Davies replacing the brand name "Coca-Cola" with "cherry cola" in the lyrics prior to the release of the record to avoid a possible ban. In other cases, it was not necessary for the BBC to formally ban a particular song, since both parties were well aware of what would be acceptable or not, as was the case of George Formby's 1937 song "With My Little Stick of Blackpool Rock".

In the case of songs that the BBC deemed politically controversial, many were not banned outright and were instead placed on a "restricted" list, in order that they not be used in "general entertainment programmes". Some of Bob Dylan's early 1960s protest songs were put on this list and so too was Barry McGuire's 1965 hit, "Eve of Destruction".

After the death of former British prime minister Margaret Thatcher on 8 April 2013, anti-Thatcher sentiment prompted campaigns on social media platforms which resulted in the song "Ding-Dong! The Witch Is Dead" reaching number 2 on the UK Singles Chart. On 12 April, Radio 1 controller Ben Cooper said that the station's chart show would not play the song in the usual format, but that a short snippet would be aired as part of a news item.

List of banned songs

The following is a list of songs which have been banned by the BBC over the years. Some were banned from particular shows (e.g. children's programming), while others were banned for a limited period, and have since received BBC airplay. In some cases, more information about the banned songs can be found in their respective articles. 

As the first Gulf War began, the BBC deemed several songs inappropriate for airplay in light of the situation and subsequently banned them from their radio stations for the duration of the war. A list of 67 banned songs was published by New Statesman and Society in conjunction with British public-service television broadcaster Channel 4. These songs have  against them.

  


0–9

List of banned discographies

 Lostprophets' discography (from 2014–onwards)
 Alan Bush's discography (from March–June 1941)
 Ewan MacColl's discography (from World War II-end of the Cold War)

See also
 2001 Clear Channel memorandum

Notes

References

Banned by the BBC
Singles banned
BBC-related lists
Censorship of broadcasting in the United Kingdom
British music-related lists
Blacklisting in the United Kingdom
 
Radio controversies
Lists of banned works